Zaireichthys flavomaculatus is a species of loach catfish endemic to the Democratic Republic of the Congo where it is only found in the Lulua River.  It reaches a length of 3.9 cm.  The humeral process of the pectoral girdle is moderately long with poorly developed or fine denticulations.

References 
 

Amphiliidae
Fish of the Democratic Republic of the Congo
Endemic fauna of the Democratic Republic of the Congo
Fish described in 1926